Pencak silat at the 2011 Southeast Asian Games was held at Padepokan Pencak Silat Taman Mini Indonesia Indah, Jakarta.

Medal summary

Artistic

Tarung

Men

Women

Medal table

External links
  2011 Southeast Asian Games

2011 Southeast Asian Games events
2011